A Double Life is a 1924 Czechoslovak drama film directed by Václav Kubásek.

Cast
 Mary Jansová as Žofie Dražilová
 Saša Dobrovolná as Žofie's mother
 Jan W. Speerger as Rudolf Slaba
 Eduard Malý as Jan Rokyta
 Jerzy Pawikowski as Beneš
 František Havel as Vojtěch Beneš
 Marie Černá as Jitřenka
 Antonín Marek as Landlord Svoboda
 Tekla Černá as Kateřina Svobodová
 Betty Kysilková as  Bábinka 
 Jiří Gsöllhofer as Jaroslav Beneš 
 Marie Fingerová as Jaroslav's Mother 
 Karel Lamač as Drunkard

References

External links 
 

1924 films
1924 drama films
Czechoslovak black-and-white films
Czech silent films
Czechoslovak drama films
Silent drama films